Backlash Cop is the third full-length release from Northern Irish band, Jetplane Landing. Released in 2007 on the Smalltown America label it received mixed reviews. The Album makes many references to black American jazz musicians, notably on "Dizzy Gillespie For President", and "Climbing Up The Face Of Miles Davis". The songs "Backlash Cop", "Dizzy Gillespie For President", "Lungs Of Punk", and "Why Do They Never Play Les Savy Fav On The Radio?" were made available on the band's MySpace page before the album's release.

Credits 
All songs by Jetplane Landing

Personnel 
 Andrew Ferris - vocals, guitar
 Raife Burchell - drums
 Cahir O'Doherty - lead guitar
 Jamie Burchell - bass guitar
 Harvey Birrell - engineering, recording, mixing, mastering
 Matt Littler - sleeve art
 Andy Rouse - sleeve design, layout

References 

Jetplane Landing albums
2007 albums